Gareth Honor (born  in Farnborough, London, England) is an English former professional rugby league footballer who played in the 2000s and 2010s. He played for London Skolars in National League Two.

He was with the London Broncos in the Super League.

References

External links
(archived by web.archive.org) London Skolars profile 
Statistics at rugbyleagueproject.org
London Broncos profile

1981 births
Living people
Batley Bulldogs players
English rugby league players
Hemel Stags players
London Broncos players
London Skolars players
People from Farnborough, London
Rugby articles needing expert attention
Rugby league hookers
Rugby league players from Kent